Leucoblepsis taiwanensis is a moth in the family Drepanidae that is endemic to Taiwan.

Adults have been recorded from April to December.

References

Drepaninae
Moths described in 2003
Endemic fauna of Taiwan
Moths of Taiwan